The 2017–18 Divizia A1 season was the 68th season of the Divizia A1, the highest professional volleyball league in Romania. CSM Volei Alba Blaj was the defending champion. At the end of the season, CSM București won their first title.

Competition format
The competition format will be the same as in the previous season.

 12 teams played the regular season, consisting in a double-legged round robin format.
 At the end of the regular season, teams are split into two groups, one of them composed by the first six teams and the other one by the rest. In this second stage all points of the regular season are counted and the teams will face each other from its group twice.

Teams
SCM U Craiova and CSU Galați were relegated to Divizia A2. Unic Piatra Neamț and SCM Ptești withdrew from Divizia A1.

Agroland Timișoara and Universitatea Cluj promoted from Divizia A2.

Regular season table

Play-off

Play-out
In the meeting of the Board of Directors of the Romanian Volleyball Federation from 26 February 2018 it was decided to cancel the play-out round, places 7–10. The final ranking for these places remains the same as that at the end of the regular season.

References

External links
Official site of the Romanian Volleyball Federation
Voleiromania.ro (Romanian)

2017-18
Romanian
2017 in women's volleyball
2018 in women's volleyball